Sher Ali Afridi, also called Shere Ali, is known for killing Lord Mayo, the Viceroy of India, on 8 February 1872.  He was a prisoner on the Andaman and Nicobar Islands at the time, sentenced for murder.

Early life
Sher Ali worked for the colonial government in the Punjab Police in the 1860s. He came from the Tirah valley in the Khyber Agency and worked for the Commissioner of Peshawar. He was in colonial army at Ambala in a cavalry regiment. He served in the Presidency armies in Rohilkhand and Oudh during the Indian Rebellion of 1857.  He worked under Major Hugh James as a cavalry trooper in Peshawar and as a mounted orderly for Reynell Taylor, who awarded Sher Ali with a horse, pistol and certificate. Due to his good character, Sher Ali was popular among Europeans and was taking care of Taylor's children. In a family feud, he killed one of his relatives named Hydur at Peshawar in broad daylight and although he pleaded innocence, he was sentenced to death on 2 April 1867. On appeal, his sentence was reduced by a judge, Colonel Pollock, to life imprisonment and he was deported to Kala Pani or the Andaman and Nicobar Islands, to serve his sentence. He was permitted to work as a barber at Port Blair as he was acknowledged to have behaved well since his arrival.

Murder of Lord Mayo
Richard Bourke, 6th Earl of Mayo, Viceroy of India from 1869, was visiting the Andaman and Nicobar Islands in February 1872. The island group was then  used as a British penal colony for convicts from India, both criminals and political prisoners. Lord Mayo was involved in drafting the regulations of Port Blair, the principal town of the islands. On 8 February, when the Viceroy had almost completed his inspection and was returning at 7:00 PM to his boat, where Lady Mayo was also waiting, Sher Ali Afridi appeared from the dark and stabbed him. Sher Ali was immediately arrested by twelve security personnel. Lord Mayo soon bled to death. This incident, which attracted much attention to the island group, happened at the foot of Mount Harriet.

Aftermath
The murder of the Viceroy, the supreme official of India appointed by the British Crown, sent shock waves throughout Britain and British India. Sher Ali Afridi wanted to kill two white people, the Superintendent and the Viceroy, as a revenge for his sentence, which he thought was more severe than he deserved. He waited for a full day and only in the evening, found an opportunity to kill the Viceroy. He said that he killed on the instructions of God. He readily posed for photographs. Some jihadist-inspired prisoners were jailed at Andaman during the same period but the British found no link to the murder of the Viceroy and the presence of these prisoners. Sher Ali Afridi was condemned to death and was hanged on the gallows of Viper Island prison,  on 11 March 1872.

See also
Mohammad Abdullah (India)

References

Bibliography
F. A. M. Dass (1937): The Andaman Islands.
Prof. Sen : Disciplining Punishment: Colonialism and Convict Society in the Andaman Islands. Oxford University Press.

Year of birth unknown
1872 deaths
19th-century executions by British India
19th-century Indian criminals
Afridi people
British East India Company Army soldiers
Executed assassins
Executed Indian people
Indian assassins
19th-century Indian Muslims
Indian people convicted of murder
People convicted of murder by India
People executed by British India by hanging
People from Khyber District
People from Peshawar